Coleen Sommer (born June 6, 1960, in Los Angeles) is a retired high jumper from the United States, who was born as Coleen Rienstra. She represented her native country at the 1988 Summer Olympics in Seoul, South Korea. She set her personal best at 2.00 metres indoors on 1982-02-14 in Ottawa.

Achievements

References

External links
 
 Profile at mtsacrelays.com

1960 births
Living people
Track and field athletes from Los Angeles
American female high jumpers
Athletes (track and field) at the 1988 Summer Olympics
Athletes (track and field) at the 1983 Pan American Games
Athletes (track and field) at the 1987 Pan American Games
Olympic track and field athletes of the United States
Pan American Games gold medalists for the United States
Arizona State University alumni
Pan American Games medalists in athletics (track and field)
Medalists at the 1983 Pan American Games
Medalists at the 1987 Pan American Games
20th-century American women